Pseudohemihyalea despaignei is a moth in the family Erebidae. It was described by Hervé de Toulgoët in 1982. It is found in Panama.

References

Moths described in 1982
despaignei